Jay Bellamy (born July 8, 1972) is a former American football safety who played for the Seattle Seahawks and the New Orleans Saints of the National Football League (NFL). After playing college football at Rutgers University, he went undrafted in the 1994 NFL Draft. He was then signed as an undrafted free agent to the Seattle Seahawks.

Early years
Bellamy was raised in the Cliffwood section of Aberdeen Township, New Jersey and attended Matawan Regional High School, where he was a letterman in football and track. In football, he was a two-way starter as a quarterback and as a free safety.

College career 
Bellamy attended Rutgers University, and played for the Rutgers Scarlet Knights football team. In his first season, he appeared in 6 games and had 2 interceptions and returned them both for a total of 48 yards and one for a touchdown. In his second season, he appeared in 11 games and had 2 interceptions and returned them both for a total of 25 yards. In his third season he appeared in 10 games and had 4 interceptions and returned them for a total of 9 yards. In his last season he appeared in 9 games and returned 5 punts for a total of 60 yards.

Professional career

1994 season

1995 season

1996 season

1997 season

1998 season

1999 season

2000 season

2001 season

2002 season

2003 season

2004 season

2005 season

2006 season

2007 season

Personal life 
His son, Jayden, attends Bergen Catholic High School in Oradell, New Jersey, and committed to Notre Dame as part of the 2022 recruiting class.

References

External links
New Orleans Saints bio

1972 births
Living people
Matawan Regional High School alumni
People from Aberdeen Township, New Jersey
Players of American football from New Jersey
Sportspeople from Monmouth County, New Jersey
Sportspeople from Perth Amboy, New Jersey
American football safeties
Rutgers Scarlet Knights football players
Seattle Seahawks players
New Orleans Saints players